Anna Sewell (30 March 1820 – 25 April 1878) was an English novelist. She is known as the author of the 1877 novel Black Beauty, her only published work, which is considered one of the top ten best selling novels for children, although the author intended the work for an adult audience. Sewell died only five months after Black Beautys publication, having lived long enough to see her only novel become a success.

Biography

Early life
Sewell was born on March 30, 1820, in Great Yarmouth, Norfolk, into a devout Quaker family. Her father was Isaac Phillip Sewell (1793–1879), and her mother, Mary Wright Sewell (1798–1884), was a successful author of children's books. She had one sibling, a younger brother named Philip. The children were largely educated at home by their mother due to a lack of money for schooling.

In 1822, Isaac's business, a small shop, failed and the family moved to Dalston, London. Life was difficult for the family, and Isaac and Mary frequently sent Philip and Anna to stay with Mary's parents in Buxton, Norfolk.

In 1832, when she was twelve, the family moved to Stoke Newington and Sewell attended school for the first time. At fourteen, Sewell slipped and severely injured her ankles. For the rest of her life, she could not stand without a crutch or walk for any length of time. For greater mobility, she frequently used horse-drawn carriages, which contributed to her love of horses and concern for the humane treatment of animals.

Adult life 
In 1836, Sewell's father took a job in Brighton, in the hope that the climate there would help to cure her. At about the same time, both Sewell and her mother left the Society of Friends to join the Church of England, though both remained active in evangelical circles. Her mother expressed her religious faith most noticeably by authoring a series of evangelical children's books, which Sewell helped to edit, though all the Sewells, and Mary Sewell's family, the Wrights, engaged in many other good works. Sewell assisted her mother, for example, to establish a working men's club, and worked with her on temperance and abolitionist campaigns.

In 1845, the family moved to Lancing, and Sewell's health began to deteriorate. She traveled to Europe the following year to seek treatment. On her return, the family continued to relocate – to Abson near Wick in 1858 and to Bath in 1864.

In 1866, Philip's wife died, leaving him with seven young children to care for, and the following year the Sewells moved to Old Catton, a village outside the city of Norwich in Norfolk, to support him.

Black Beauty
While living in Old Catton, Sewell wrote the manuscript of Black Beauty – in the period between 1871 and 1877.  During this time her health was declining; she was often so weak that she was confined to her bed. Writing was a challenge. She dictated the text to her mother and from 1876 began to write on slips of paper which her mother then transcribed.

The book is considered to be one of the first English novels to be written from the perspective of a non-human animal, in this case a horse. Although it is now considered a children's classic, Sewell originally wrote it for those who worked with horses. She said "a special aim was to induce kindness, sympathy, and an understanding treatment of horses". In many respects the book can be read as a guide to horse husbandry, stable management and humane training practices for colts. It is considered to have had an effect on reducing cruelty to horses; for example, the use of bearing reins, which are particularly painful for a horse, was one of the practices highlighted in the novel. In the years after the book's publication, they eventually fell out of favour.

Sewell sold the novel to Norwich publisher Jarrolds on 24 November 1877, when she was 57 years old. She received a single payment of £40 (£3,456 or US$4,630 in 2017) and the book was published the same year.

Death
After the publication of her only novel, Black Beauty, Sewell fell seriously ill. She was in extreme pain and completely bedridden for the following months, and she died on April 25, 1878, aged 58 of hepatitis or tuberculosis, only five months after the publication of Black Beauty. She was buried on 30 April 1878 at Quaker burial ground in Lamas near Buxton, Norfolk, not far from Norwich.

Memorials and monuments

Sewell's birthplace in Church Plain, Great Yarmouth has been the home to a museum and a tea shop and is currently leased by Redwings Horse Sanctuary. The house in Old Catton where she wrote Black Beauty is now known as Anna Sewell House.

There is an Anna Sewell memorial fountain and horse trough outside the public library in Ansonia, Connecticut, in the United States of America. It was donated by Caroline Phelps Stokes, a philanthropist known for her work supporting animal welfare, in 1892.

A memorial fountain to Sewell is located at the junction of Constitution Hill and St. Clement's Hill in Norwich, which also marks the entrance to Sewell Park. The fountain was placed in 1917 by Sewell's niece Ada Sewell.

On 1 September 1984, the graveyard at Lamas was bulldozed by contractors under the direction of Mrs Wendy Forsey without prior warning or permission. Tombstones, graves and cypress trees were removed and dumped at the edge of the burial ground. The act was condemned by locals and Council Chairman John Perkins, who said: "I know the land belongs to a private person but I would almost say it was as bad as vandalism. I know Quaker ground is not consecrated, but for anybody to just pull down gravestones of any Quaker, whether it's Anna Sewell or not, well, I think it's despicable". The gravestones of Anna, her parents and maternal grandparents were subsequently placed in a flint-and-brick wall outside the old Lammas Quaker meeting house.

In 2020, a street in Chichester, West Sussex, was named in Sewell's honour on the Keepers Green estate.

See also
Sewell Park, Norwich
Sewell Barn Theatre
Sewell Park Academy

References

External links

 
 
 
 

1820 births
1878 deaths
19th-century English women writers
19th-century English writers
Burials in Norfolk
Converts to Anglicanism from Quakerism
English children's writers
English women novelists
People from Great Yarmouth
People from Old Catton
Former Quakers
19th-century deaths from tuberculosis
Tuberculosis deaths in England